Abrams Municipal Airport  is a city-owned, public-use airport located two nautical miles (3.7 km) north of the central business district of Grand Ledge, a city in Eaton County, Michigan, United States. It is included in the Federal Aviation Administration (FAA) National Plan of Integrated Airport Systems for 2017–2021, in which it is categorized as a local general aviation facility.

Facilities and aircraft 
It has two runways: 9/27 is 3,200 by 75 feet (975 x 23 m) with an asphalt surface; 18/36 is 2,580 by 120 feet (786 x 37 m) with a turf surface. Runway 18/36 is closed to fixed-wing aircraft from November through April. The airport is staffed daily from 8AM until dusk.

The airport completed a runway upgrade and expansion in 2021. The main airport was resurfaced and had its lights upgraded.

The airport has a fixed-base operator that offers fuel as well as maintenance, a crew lounge, snooze rooms, and more.

For the 12-month period ending December 31, 2020, the airport had 12,400 aircraft operations, an average of 34 per day: 82% general aviation and 19% military. At that time there were 43 aircraft based at this airport: 22 single-engine and 2 multi-engine airplanes as well as 19 military aircraft.

Remarks:
 Activate MIRL runway 09/27 and REIL runway 27 - CTAF
 Intensive National Guard helicopter training on and in the vicinity of airport
 Runway 18/36 closed to fixed-wing aircraft November–April, soft in spring
 Avoid overflight of Grand Ledge below 
 This airport has been surveyed by the National Geodetic Survey.
 TPA for helicopters  MSL (858 ft AGL); fixed wing TPA  MSL

Accidents and incidents
On June 25, 2007, a Piper J3F-65 ground looped on takeoff from Abrams Municipal. The left main landing gear collapsed during the accident sequence. The probable cause was found to be the pilot's failure to maintain directional control during takeoff resulting in a ground loop.

References

External links 
   at Michigan Airport Directory
 Grand Air Aviation, the fixed-base operator (FBO)
 Aerial photo as of 23 April 1998 from USGS The National Map
 

Airports in Michigan
Buildings and structures in Clinton County, Michigan
Transportation in Clinton County, Michigan